Nigeria participated at the 2017 Summer Universiade which was held in Taipei, Taiwan.

Nigeria sent a delegation consisting of 59 competitors for the event competing in 7 sporting events. Nigeria didn't win any medals at the multi-sport event.

Participants

References 

2017 in Nigerian sport
Nations at the 2017 Summer Universiade